Muttaiya Chidambaram Chettiar Muthiah Chidambaram Chettiar (2 August 1908  13 March 1954) was an Indian industrialist and banker who founded the Indian Overseas Bank. He was a member of the M. Ct. family.

Early life and education 

Chidambaram Chettyar was born at Kanadukathan on 2 August 1908. His father Sir M Ct. Muthiah Chettiar (1887-1929) was a banker who served as a member of the Imperial Legislative Council of India. Muthiah Chettiar was a nephew of Ramaswami Chettiar, founder of the Indian Bank and Sir Annamalai Chettiar, the first Raja of Chettinad.

Chidambaram Chettyar had his early education at Madras Christian College High School but discontinued his education in the middle to pursue the family business of banking.

Career 

Chidambaram Chettyar succeeded his father as a director of the Indian Bank on the latter's death in 1929. Chidambaram Chettyar soon emerged as one of the top industrialists in the country. On 10 February 1937, he founded the Indian Overseas Bank, which concentrated on improving the country's industrial sector. The bank began business simultaneously from its branches at Karaikudi and Rangoon. Chidambaram Chettyar was also one of the founders of United India Assurance.

In 1944, with the assistance of Sir C. P. Ramaswami Iyer and British technical expertise, Chidambaram Chettyar founded the Travancore Rayons Limited, with a factory near Perumbavoor. The Travancore Rayons Limited was the first rayon manufacturing company in India. Chidambaram Chettyar also served as a director of Indian Bank from 1930 to 1940 and 1945 to 1949.

Death 

Chidambaram Chettyar died on 13 March 1954 when the British Overseas Airways flight Lockheed L-749A Constellation, G-ALAM on which he was travelling, crashed at Kallang Airport, Singapore, when it landed short and struck a sea wall after a flight from Jakarta, killing 33 people out of 40 passengers and crew on board.

Family 

Chidambaram Chettyar was married to Valliammai Achi. They had two sons - Muthiah and Pethachi.

References 

 
 

1908 births
1954 deaths
Indian bankers
Indian company founders
Businesspeople from Tamil Nadu
Victims of aviation accidents or incidents in India
Indian businesspeople in textiles
Indian industrialists
Members of the Central Legislative Assembly of India
20th-century Indian philanthropists